"Thumbling," published in German as "Daumesdick" (literally, "Thumb-thick") is a German fairy tale collected by the Brothers Grimm in Grimm's Fairy Tales in 1819 (KHM 37). The Grimms included another, similar story, "Thumbling's Travels." Both stories are related to the English Tom Thumb and often share its title when translated into English.

It is categorized as Aarne-Thompson type 700 ("Tom Thumb") and also contains an episode of type 41 ("Overeating in the Pantry").

Synopsis
In "Thumbling", a poor childless peasant couple wishes for a child "no matter how small" aloud. Seven months later the wife has a small child "no longer than a thumb" which they call "Thumbling" and who becomes a "wise and nimble creature." Thumbling as he grows wishes to help his father in the chores so one day asks if he can lead their horse to where his father is working by sitting in the horse's ear and giving it directions. As Thumbling performs this chore, two strange men notice the horse being led by a loud voice, and when they find out the voice belongs to a person sitting in the horse's ear, ask the peasant if they can buy Thumbling to "make a fortune" in exhibiting the little man. Thumbling convinces the peasant to take the money and leaves with the men by sitting on the brim of one of the men's hats. Then after a while Thumbling tricks the men into letting him down and he goes to hide in a mouse hole.

Later in the night Thumbling tries to sleep in a snail shell but is awakened by the sound of robbers plotting to rob a pastor's house. Thumbling yells out to them to take him along and he will help them rob it, by going into the house and handing things out to them. The robbers agree to carry him to the pastor and Thumbling makes much noise in the house pretending to help the robbers steal. Thumbling wakes people up by yelling things like "What do you want? Do you want everything...?" making the robbery very obvious. A maid wakes up and scares off the robbers but does not see Thumbling. Thumbling gets a good night sleep in the hay. However, in the morning the maid feeds the hay that he was sleeping in to the cow. Thumbling begins to yell from the cow's stomach but the pastor thinks that an "evil spirit" had entered the cow, and has it killed. The cow's stomach is thrown into a dung heap, and before Thumbling climbs all the way out of the stomach, a wolf eats it. Thumbling, now inside of the wolf's stomach, persuades the wolf to take him home to his parents' on pretense of eating everything there. His parents kill the wolf to get Thumbling out and promise never to sell him again, not for "all the riches in the world." They give him food, drink and new clothes.

Textual information

The original KHM 37 "Von der Serviette, dem Kanonenhütlein und dem Horn" (first edition, 1812) was replaced by "Daumesdick" in the 2nd edition (1819).

Analysis

Classification
KHM 37 Daumesdick ("Thumbling") is categorized as tale type ATU 700, under the general title "Tom Thumb" type tales. The Grimms also noted that the two belonged to the "same class of fables".

Edgar Taylor who translated Daumesdick as "Tom Thumb" in 1823, pointed out that the character is paralleled by the English folklore character Tom Thumb. Taylor also theorized, based on the characters' names, that another parallel was Tam Lin.

Medical aspects
Thumbling ("Daumesdick") was born after only 7 months since his mother fell ill, but his premature birth notwithstanding, it has been pointed out that there was a German superstition that 7-month gestation resulted in the birth of a child with more vigor, as described under the entry "Sieben monatlich" (Seven Monthly) in Johann Heinrich Zedler's 18th century Great Universal Lexicon.

See also

 Issun-boshi
 Thumbelina
 Thumbling's Travels

References

Bibliography

 Bolte, Johannes; Polívka, Jiri. Anmerkungen zu den Kinder- u. hausmärchen der brüder Grimm. Erster Band (NR. 1-60). Germany, Leipzig: Dieterich'sche Verlagsbuchhandlung. 1913. pp. 389–398.
 
 
 
 
 . Reprinted (1904), Henry Frowde.

Further reading
 Raufman, Ravit. "The Birth of Fingerling as a Feminine Projection: Maternal Psychological Mechanisms in the Fingerling Fairy Tale". In: Western Folklore 68, no. 1 (2009): 49–71. http://www.jstor.org/stable/40600497.

External links

 

Grimms' Fairy Tales
Fairy tale stock characters
ATU 700-749